Asher Keen Wah Hong (born March 23, 2004) is an American artistic gymnast.  He is a member of the United States men's national gymnastics team.

Personal life 
Young was born in Plano, Texas on March 23, 2004 to Rick and Karen Hong.  He has two brothers, both of whom are also gymnasts.

Gymnastics career

2018 
Hong competed at the RD761 International Junior Team Cup where he helped his team place third and individually he placed sixth on floor exercise.  He competed at the 2018 Winter Cup where he placed first in the junior division and also won gold on rings and parallel bars.  Hong was selected to compete at the Pacific Rim Championships alongside fellow juniors Lazarus Barnhill and Justin Ah Chow and seniors Sam Mikulak, Akash Modi, and Marvin Kimble; together they placed first in the team competition and Hong placed second in the all-around behind Barnhill.  During event finals Hong won gold on pommel horse, silver on floor exercise, and bronze on rings and parallel bars.

2019–21 
Hong competed at the 2019 U.S. National Championships where he finished third in the all-around in the 15-16 age division.  In early 2020 Hong competed at the RD761 Gymnastics Invitational where he helped his team finish second.  Individually he won bronze on the horizontal bar.  At the 2020 Winter Cup he placed second in the all-around.  The rest of the competitions throughout the year were either canceled or postponed due to the global COVID-19 pandemic.

Hong returned to competition in early 2021; he competed at the Elite Team Cup and the 2021 Winter Cup.  He won the junior all-around competition at the latter event.  Additionally he placed first on floor exercise, pommel horse, rings, and parallel bars.  In November Hong signed his National Letter of Intent with Stanford University, intending to begin competing with their gymnastics team in the 2022–2023 season.

2022 
Hong became age-eligible for senior competition starting in 2022.  He competed at the 2022 Winter Cup where he placed third in the all-around behind Vitaliy Guimaraes and Khoi Young. During event finals he won gold on vault, silver on floor exercise and rings, and bronze on parallel bars.  As a result Hong was selected to represent the USA at the DTB Pokal Team Challenge in Stuttgart alongside Guimaraes, Young, Brody Malone, and Yul Moldauer.  While there he helped the USA place first as a team.  During event finals Hong won gold on rings, silver on floor exercise behind Félix Dolci, and placed fourth on parallel bars.

In August Hong competed at the U.S. National Championships.  He placed third in the all-around behind Brody Malone and Donnell Whittenburg.  Additionally he placed second on floor exercise, third on rings, and first on vault.  In October Hong was named to the team to compete at the 2022 World Championships alongside Brody Malone, Stephen Nedoroscik, Colt Walker, and Donnell Whittenburg.  During qualifications Hong finished sixth in the all-around qualified for the final.  During the team final Hong contributed scores on all apparatuses besides the horizontal bar towards the USA's fifth place finish.  During the all-around final Hong finished sixth.

Competitive history

References

External links
 
 

2004 births
Living people
Sportspeople from Plano, Texas
American male artistic gymnasts
Stanford Cardinal men's gymnasts